Bob Martinez Sports Center is a 3,432-seat multi-purpose arena in Tampa, Florida named after former Tampa mayor and governor of Florida, Bob Martinez.

The facility is home to the University of Tampa Spartans men's and women's basketball teams, as well as the Spartans volleyball team. The Spartan Sports Center, as it was then known, hosted the Continental Basketball Association's Tampa Bay Thrillers for their 1985–86 season. It was also the planned home of the Tampa Bay Strong Dogs of the American Basketball Association, but the team folded without playing a game in Tampa.  The facility is on the University of Tampa campus across the Hillsborough River from downtown Tampa and was opened in 1984.

References

American Basketball Association (2000–present) venues
Basketball venues in Florida
College basketball venues in the United States
Sports venues in Tampa, Florida
1984 establishments in Florida
Continental Basketball Association venues
Sports venues completed in 1984
Former South Florida Bulls sports venues